Habsburg generally refers to the House of Habsburg, an important and influential European family that held several royal titles.

The House of Habsburg-Lorraine (often shortened to House of Habsburg) succeeded the original House of Habsburg after the latter became extinct in the male line.

Habsburg may also refer to:

 85199 Habsburg, a main-belt asteroid
 Habsburg, Austria (Vienna), the resident city of the Habsburg dynasty in Austria
 Habsburg Castle, the original seat of the Habsburg family
 Habsburg Hungary, Kingdom of Hungary during the Habsburg rule: (1437-1457), (1526-1867) or (1867-1918)
 Habsburg monarchy, the countries that were ruled by the junior Austrian branch of the House of Habsburg and then by the successor House of Habsburg-Lorraine
 Habsburg Moravia, a Habsburg possession from 1526 until the end of World War I
 Habsburg Netherlands, the Imperial fiefs in the Low Countries of Belgium, the Netherlands, and Luxembourg
 Habsburg Spain, the rule of Spain in the 16th and 17th centuries by the Habsburg dynasty 
 Habsburg, Switzerland, a town in Switzerland
 Habsburg-Valois War (Italian Wars from 1494 to 1559), a general struggle for power and territory among various participants

See also 
 Habsburg Hungary (disambiguation)
 Philippine Dynasty
 von Habsburg, surname